Gandomkal (also Romanized as Gandomkāl; also known as Gandomkār) is a village in Tayebi-ye Sarhadi-ye Gharbi Rural District, Charusa District, Kohgiluyeh County, Kohgiluyeh and Boyer-Ahmad Province, Iran. At the 2006 census, its population was 100, in 15 families.

References 

Populated places in Kohgiluyeh County